Hebner is a surname. Notable people with the surname include:

 Dave Hebner (1949–2022), American professional wrestling authority figure, promoter, road agent and referee
 Earl Hebner (born 1949), professional wrestling referee currently working for Impact Wrestling, and the twin brother of Dave Hebner
 Harry Hebner (1891–1968), American backstroke and freestyle swimmer as well as a water polo player, who competed in the 1908, 1912 and 1920 Summer Olympics
 Martin Hebner (1959–2021), German politician
 Richie Hebner (born 1947), former third baseman in Major League Baseball who had an 18-year career from 1968 to 1985